"The Blues Come Around" is a song written and recorded by Hank Williams for MGM Records.  It was released as the B-side to the single "I'm a Long Gone Daddy" in June 1948.  It was recorded at Castle Studio in Nashville with Fred Rose producing and backing from Jerry Byrd (steel guitar), Robert "Chubby" Wise (fiddle), Zeke Turner (lead guitar), probably Louis Innis (bass) and either Owen Bradley or Rose on piano. Waylon Jennings recorded the song for his 1992 album Ol' Waylon Sings Ol' Hank.

References

Bibliography
 

1947 songs
Songs written by Hank Williams
Hank Williams songs
Song recordings produced by Fred Rose (songwriter)